Vol Sevier Dooley Jr. (January 20, 1927 – August 11, 2014), was the sheriff of Bossier Parish in northwestern Louisiana from 1976 until 1988. He was involved in the false conviction of rodeo star Jack Favor in 1967.

Early life and career
Born in Memphis, Tennessee, Dooley joined Troop G of the Louisiana State Police in 1950, and in 1954, joined the Bossier Sheriff's Office. With the state police, he developed an expertise in fingerprinting and photographic equipment, which he brought to the sheriff's department.

In 1967, as chief deputy, Dooley was accused of involvement in a plot by Sheriff Waggonner, Judge O. E. Price, and District Attorney Louis H. Padgett Jr. to falsely convict rodeo champion Jack Favor of Fort Worth, Texas, of the double-murder of an elderly couple. Favor sued for wrongful conviction and imprisonment, settling for $55,000.

Service as sheriff
Dooley was elected sheriff in a special election in 1976 to fill the remainder of the preceding term, and was reelected in 1979 and 1983. In 1984, Dooley and six of his deputies were found liable for injuries incurred by prison inmate Jessie Lee Smith while being transported from the Bossier Parish Jail in Benton to the Elayn Hunt Correctional Center in St. Gabriel, Louisiana.

In 1985, Dooley was cited in a Chicago Tribune piece on Louisiana politics, noting Dooley's friendship with Governor Edwin Edwards:

Dooley lost his final bid for reelection in October 1987 to former chief deputy, Larry Deen, with Dooley winning less than 29 percent of the vote. Dooley thereafter worked in security for the Port of Shreveport.

Personal life and death
Dooley divorced his first wife, with whom he had four children, and remarried. One of his sons, Vol Dooley III, was murdered in 2001. Dooley died in Bossier City at age 87, following a long illness.

References

 

 

1927 births
2014 deaths
Louisiana sheriffs
American deputy sheriffs
Louisiana Democrats
Louisiana Republicans
People from Memphis, Tennessee
People from Bossier City, Louisiana
American state police officers
Baptists from Tennessee
Baptists from Louisiana